Jean Harris (1923–2012) was an American educator and convicted murderer.

Jean Harris may also refer to:

Jean Harris (activist) (1944–2011), American lesbian activist
Jean Harris (environmentalist) (1922–2008), American environmentalist
Jean Thomson Harris (1883–1963), wife of Paul Harris, a lawyer who founded the first Rotary Club
Jean L. Harris, American physician and politician

in fiction:
Jean Harris (Coronation Street), a fictional character on Coronation Street

See also
Gene Harris (disambiguation)